Jamie Robert Campbell (born 18 May 1977) is an English television producer and film maker. He lives in London and studied at Radley College and Durham University, where he read English Literature. He has been described as "a kind of Louis Theroux for the post-geek lady viewer."

He has produced, directed, and appeared in prime time documentaries including Martha and Me (BBC2), Osama and US (C4), Come Home Gary Glitter (BBC3), and Candid Cameron (BBC2), in which he interviewed the future Prime Minister over the course of a month. 

In 2007, Campbell hosted his own prime time chat show for ITV1, entitled 24 Hours With. His interviewees included Bobby Brown, Steve-O, Stan Collymore, Lawrence Llewelyn Bowen, David Gest, and Lee Ryan.

Eleven, the television production company founded in 2006 by Campbell and Joel Wilson, has made a number of notable scripted series including Sex Education, The Enfield Haunting, Cast Offs, Gap Year and Glue. 

Campbell has written cover stories for the New Statesman, and The Guardian.

On 10 September 2011 he married Amber Sainsbury on the island of Paxos in Greece.

External links

References 

1977 births
Living people
British television producers
British documentary film directors
Alumni of St John's College, Durham
People educated at Radley College